This Is How You Smile is the sixth studio album by American musician Helado Negro. It was released in March 2019 under RVNG Intl.

Critical reception 
In a year-end essay for Slate, Ann Powers cited This Is How You Smile as proof that the album era format is not dead in 2019 but rather undergoing a "metamorphosis", with artists such as Negro utilizing the concept album through the culturally-relevant autobiographical narratives, which in this case is a "bilingual love letter to his family".

Track listing

Personnel
Credits adapted from liner notes and AllMusic.

 Roberto Carlos Lange – vocals, Casio MT-30, electric banjo, electronic percussion, classical guitar, electric guitar, Juno, Korg synthesizer, Moog synthesizer, noise, ondes, Roland Juno-6, vibraphone, field recording, recording, mixing, engineering
 Adron – vocals
 Raquel Berrios – vocals
 Luis del Valle – vocals
 Nene Humphrey – vocals
 Ela Minus – vocals
 Victoria Ruiz – vocals
 Xenia Rubinos – vocals
 Kristi Sword – echo, footsteps, whistle
 Matthew Crum – guitar, bass
 Keith Reynaud – guitar
 Owen Stewart-Robertson – guitar
 Jenn Wasner – guitar
 Sufjan Stevens – piano
 Bryan Abdul Collins – synthesizer
 Chris Devoe – synthesizer
 Oliver Hill – viola, violin
 Jason Trammell – drums
 Joe Westerlund – drums
Jason Nazary – drums
 Jay Wynne – drums
 Tim Barnes – percussion
 Andy Stack – steel pan
 Jason Ajemian – bass
 Logan Coale – bass
 Nick Sanborn – synthesizer arrangements, writer
 Aquiles Navarro – trumpet
 Angela Morris – saxophone
 Nathaniel Morgan – saxophone
 Jean Cook – field recording
 Michael Kaufmann – field recording
 Isaac Lekach – field recording
 Matana Roberts – field recording
 Matt Werth – field recording
 Rachel Alina – mastering
 Anna Grothe-Shive – photography
 Will Work For Good – design
 Michelle Grinser – lacquer cut

References

2019 albums